Brethour is a township in the Canadian province of Ontario, located within the Timiskaming District.

The township had a population of 97 in the 2016 Canadian Census.

History

Brethour Township was surveyed in 1887. It was then later officially incorporated on October 17, 1917. The township's title was derived from the name of a prominent business man from Brantford, Ontario: H.W. Brethour.

Located in the District of Temiskaming, Brethour sits on the Ontario/Quebec provincial border. The first people to settle in the area were Edmond and Philomene Robert. Other mentionable early-settler family names include Schmidt, Cooke, Armstrong, Doonan, Broderick, and Goddard; many of which have living descendants still residing within the community. Most notably, Mr. Leonard Broderick continues to own and reside at the farm in which his great-grandfather William Broderick settled in 1903. Although the Brodericks are the only family to have remained on the same original land, many other original settler families have living descendants that have taken up residence on other lots within the township.

Demographics

Mother tongue (2006):
 English as first language: 91.3%
 French as first language: 8.7%
 English and French as first language: 0%
 Other as first language: 0%

See also
List of townships in Ontario
List of francophone communities in Ontario

References

External links

Municipalities in Timiskaming District
Single-tier municipalities in Ontario
Township municipalities in Ontario